Plant Harllee Branch was a coal-fired power station located in Putnam County, southeast of Eatonton, Georgia, United States. It was located between Eatonton and Milledgeville, to the southeast. The power plant was owned and operated by Georgia Power. It was named after Harllee Branch Jr., president of Georgia Power.

The power plant had one of the tallest chimneys in the world, built in 1978. Boaters used the chimney to navigate Lake Sinclair, because the power plant was located at US 441, and was a central point on the lake.

Georgia Power closed this plant in April 2015.

The demolition of the chimney was scheduled for October 9, 2016. but was postponed due to Hurricane Matthew On October 15, shortly after 8 AM, a controlled demolition took down the stack. It is the tallest multi-flue windscreen to ever be demolished.

See also 

 List of tallest chimneys
 List of tallest freestanding structures
 List of tallest demolished freestanding structures

References

External links
Chimney Diagram
Chimney Demolition

Energy infrastructure completed in 1961
Towers completed in 1978
Former coal-fired power stations in the United States
Towers in Georgia (U.S. state)
Buildings and structures in Putnam County, Georgia
Chimneys in the United States
Georgia Power
Demolished power stations in the United States
Former power stations in Georgia (U.S. state)